Jiří Půhoný (born August 27, 1992) is a Czech professional ice hockey player. He currently plays with HC Pardubice of the Czech Extraliga.

Půhoný made his Czech Extraliga debut playing with HC Pardubice during the 2011–12 Czech Extraliga season.

References

External links

1992 births
Living people
Czech ice hockey forwards
HC Dynamo Pardubice players
Hokej Šumperk 2003 players
LHK Jestřábi Prostějov players
People from Choceň
Sportspeople from the Pardubice Region